Place d'Orléans is a transitway station in the suburb of Orléans in the former city of Gloucester in Ottawa, Ontario, Canada. The station opened in 1994, just off Regional Road 174 and Champlain Street right next to Place d'Orléans Shopping Centre.  It is the main transit hub between local routes in Orléans and route 39 (previously known as route 95).

There is a park and ride lot located north of Regional Road 174 off Champlain street. This lot is accessible from the main station by a covered pedestrian overpass and is also serviced by route 39 as it departs towards Blair via the Transitway. This parking lot reaches capacity on a daily basis, and, overflow parking is allowed at the south-west corner of the Place d'Orléans Shopping Centre. The Trim station and associated park and ride lot were constructed in  alleviate pressure on the Orléans park and ride lot.

Peak period trips on route 39 departing from Trim station do not serve the station itself, and instead, access the park and ride directly from Regional Road 174 on their way downtown.

During the summer, route 139 provides special weekend service to Petrie Island Beach, located just off Trim Road.

Service

The following routes serve Place d'Orléans:

Notes 
 Route  only operates on weekends during the summer months.
 Route  only serves the park-and-ride for this station during the afternoon peak period.

References

External links

OC Transpo - Routes & Maps - Route 39

Railway stations scheduled to open in 2025
1994 establishments in Ontario
Transitway (Ottawa) stations